Gratification disorder (also known as "infantile masturbation", despite occurring in children as old as 10, or sometimes benign idiopathic infantile dyskinesia) is a form of masturbatory behavior that has often been mistaken for epilepsy, abdominal pain, and paroxysmal dystonia or dyskinesia. Little research has been published regarding this early childhood condition. However, most pediatricians agree that masturbation is a normal and common behavior in pre-teens and should be recognized as such. Failure to recognize this behavior can lead to unnecessary and invasive testing. Though the behavior may be confused with a seizure, cessation following a distraction and intact consciousness during an episode would suggest that this is not a seizure.  The behavior tends to diminish with age.

References

Pediatrics
Sexology
Child sexuality